Marko Muslin (born 17 June 1985) is a French footballer who plays for FC Wohlen.

Career
Marko Muslin started his career at Stade Brest. He later signed with OGC Nice in 2001.

He won the 2003–04 First League of Serbia and Montenegro and Serbia and Montenegro Cup trophies with Red Star Belgrade, however, he played with Red Star only the first half of the season, during the winter-break he was loaned to FK Hajduk Beograd where he played the rest of the season.

In July 2004, he joined French Ligue 1 side AS Monaco FC. In 2005, he was loaned out to Dutch side Willem II.

After playing with Lierse S.K. in the Belgian Pro League, in February 2008 Muslin signed on free transfer with Bulgarian club Lokomotiv Sofia. He left the club after 1 year and joined FC Wil 1900. In the summer of 2011 he moved to FC Lausanne-Sport, however his stay was short as he returned to Wil the following season.

In July 2015, Muslin signed a two-year contract with FC Wohlen.

In September 2018, Muslin returned to FC Wohlen on a season-long loan deal from FC Wil. Muslin stayed at the club ahead of the 2019/20 season.

Personal life
His father Slavoljub is a Serbian football manager and a former player.

References

External links
 Career history at ASF
 
 

1985 births
Living people
Sportspeople from Brest, France
French people of Serbian descent
French people of Croatian descent
French footballers
Association football midfielders
OGC Nice players
Ligue 2 players
Red Star Belgrade footballers
FK Hajduk Beograd players
AS Monaco FC players
Ligue 1 players
Willem II (football club) players
Eredivisie players
Lierse S.K. players
Belgian Pro League players
FC Lokomotiv 1929 Sofia players
PFC Slavia Sofia players
First Professional Football League (Bulgaria) players
FC Wil players
FC Lausanne-Sport players
Swiss Super League players
Swiss Challenge League players
Footballers from Brittany